The marine molluscs of Croatia are a part of the molluscan fauna of Croatia (wildlife of Croatia).

A number of species of marine molluscs are found in the wild in Croatia.

Summary table of number of species

Polyplacophorans

Marine gastropods 

Hermaeidae
 Aplysiopsis elegans (Deshayes, 1853)

Aglajidae
 Chelidonura africana Pruvot-Fol, 1953

Aplysiidae
 Aplysia dactylomela Rang, 1828

Marine bivalves

Scaphopods

Cephalopods

See also
 List of non-marine molluscs of Croatia

Lists of molluscs of surrounding countries:
 List of marine molluscs of Slovenia
 List of marine molluscs of Bosnia and Herzegovina
 List of marine molluscs of Montenegro
 List of marine molluscs of Italy (marine border)

References

External links 
 Hrs-Brenko M. (1997). "The marine bivalve mollusks in the Kornati national park and the Dugi otok natural park (Adriatic Sea)". Periodicum Biologorum 99(3): 381–395.
 Hrs-Brenko M. & Legac M. (1991). "A review of Bivalve species in the eastern Adriatic Sea. I. Protobranchia (Solemyidae, Nuculidae, Nuculanidae)". Acta Adriat. 32(2): 655–670.
 Legac M. (1987). Školjkaši (Bivalvia) otoka Raba. In: Mohorović A. (ed) Rapski zbornik, Zbornik radova sa znanstvenog skupa ootoku Rabu, 25. – 27. october 1984, JAZU and Skupšina općine Rab, Zagreb, 117–124.
 Pećarević M., Mikuš J., Bratoš Cetinić A., Dulčić J. & Čalić M. (2013). "Introduced marine species in Croatian waters (Eastern Adriatic Sea)". Mediterranean Marine Science 14(1): 224-237. PDF.
 Šiletić,  T.  (2006). "Marine  fauna  of  Mljet  National  Park (Adriatic Sea, Croatia). 5. Mollusca: Bivalvia." Natura Croatica: Periodicum Musei Historiae Naturalis Croatici, 15(3): 109-169.
 Zenetos, A., Mačić, V., Jaklin, A., Lipej, L., Poursanidis, D., Cattaneo-Vietti, R., Beqiraj, S., Betti, F., Poloniato, D., Kashta, L., Katsanevakis, S. and Crocetta, F. (2016). "Adriatic ‘opisthobranchs’ (Gastropoda, Heterobranchia): shedding light on biodiversity issues". Marine Ecology 37: 1239–1255. .

Croatia
Croatia